Les Witto (6 May 1903 – 23 August 1926) was an Australian rules footballer who played with Carlton in the Victorian Football League (VFL).

A defender, Witto was playing in just his sixth game of league football when he broke his arm in a game against Geelong and died nine days later from a tetanus infection.

Notes

External links

Profile at Blueseum

1903 births
1926 deaths
Carlton Football Club players
Australian rules footballers from New South Wales
Deaths from tetanus
Sports competitors who died in competition
Sport deaths in Australia